The Musée de Charlevoix (Charlevoix Museum) is a museum of art, ethnology and history located in La Malbaie, in the natural region of Charlevoix, in the province of Québec, in Canada. Its collection includes nearly 9000 objects and 6000 archival documents.

History 

Since the beginning of XX century, the Charlevoix region has been regularly attended by many artists, such as Clarence Gagnon or André Biéler. As early as the 1930s, American painter Patrick Morgan (1904-1982) and his wife Maud Cabot (1903-1999) were American vacationers.</ref>, who settled in “Cap-à-l'Aigle”, near La Malbaie, launches the idea of a museum dedicated to the popular art of the region.

In 1946, Roland Gagné, a collector from Pointe-au-Pic, near La Malbaie, created a private museum behind his home, which he named "Laure-Conan Regional Museum". This first establishment takes on a new dimension in 1975, when the collections are set up in the former La Malbaie post office.

In 1990, the museum moved to a building located in Pointe-au-Pic and took the name of "Musée de Charlevoix" in 1992.

Collections

Ethnohistory 
The “Musée de Charlevoix” houses an important collection of 4000 objects of Charlevoix ethnohistory. It includes furniture, clothing, toys and tools, many of which come from the personal collection of Roland Gagné.

Public and private archives, old photographs, postcards and plans have been added since 1975.

Art 
The museum gathers a large number of works of art, especially paintings and sculptures. These are works by well-known artists: Clarence Gagnon, René Richard, Georges-Henry Duquet and popular artists such as Roger Ouellette and Robert Cauchon (naive art, art brut).

Exhibitions and events 
The “Musée de Charlevoix” presents a dozen exhibitions each year. Some are devoted to artists, solo or not, others to themes of ethnohistory, still others to recent acquisitions.

See also 

 La Malbaie
 Laure Conan

References

External links 
Website

Museums in Quebec
La Malbaie